The Warranocke were an indigenous people in New England.

They are presumed to be one of the first tribes to trade with the early Puritan settlers of Colonial New England. The first entry in the Colonial Records of Connecticut, April 6, 1636, referenced a trade with the Indians where the tribe received a gun in exchange for corn.

References

Native American tribes in Connecticut